Tyranny (For You) (stylized as Tyranny ▶For You◀) is an album by Front 242, released in 1991 as their first album on Epic Records after leaving Chicago's Wax Trax! Records. It was the band's highest-charting album reaching #95 on the Billboard 200 and #5 on the CMJ Radio Top 150.  The song "Rhythm of Time" proved a dance club hit topping at #11 on the Billboard Hot Dance/Disco charts matching the previous ranking of the album's title track. The accompanying music video for "Rhythm of Time" appears briefly playing on a television in a scene in the film Single White Female. "Moldavia" was subsequently featured in TV promos for the 1992 film K2.

Track listing
All Songs Written By Front 242 & Published By Les Editions Confidentielles.

Releases
Red Rhino Europe: RRE CD 11 – CD, 1991
Red Rhino Europe: RRE LP 11 – 12" Vinyl, 1991
Epic Records (USA & Canada): EK 46998 – CD, 1991
Epic Records (USA & Canada): ET 46998 – Cassette, 1991

Personnel
 Jean-Luc De Meyer – lead vocals
 Daniel Bressanutti – keyboards, programming
 Patrick Codenys – keyboards, programming
 Richard Jonckheere – percussion, backing vocals

References

1991 albums
Front 242 albums
Red Rhino Records albums
Epic Records albums